Mangarevan narrative (or Mangarevan mythology) comprises the legends, historical tales, and sayings of the ancient Mangarevan people. It is considered a variant of a more general Polynesian narrative, developing its own unique character for several centuries before the 1830s. The religion was officially suppressed in the 19th century, and ultimately abandoned by the natives in favor of Roman Catholicism. The Mangarevan term for god was Etua.

Prominent figures and terms in Mangarevan narrative
 Tu, principal god
 Atu-motua
 Atu-moana
 Atea-Tangaroa
 Maui, among the principal gods 
 Tagaroa, among the principal gods 
 Tangaroa-Hurupapa, probably synonymous with Tagaroa
 Oro, among the principal gods
 Tairi
 Mamaru
 Ari
 Rogo, rain deity
 Toa-miru, goddess of childbirth
 Hina, a savage goddess
 Raka, god of the winds
 Huruamanu and Paparigakura mentioned as kindly gods living at Hapai
 Rao and Tupo were gods of turmeric
 Toa-hakanorenore, goddess incarnate in an eel
 Toa-huehuekaha, goddess appearing in soiled clothing
 Rekareka, god of pleasure
 Ru-te-ragi, god of the stars
 Makuputu, the god of the souls of deceased mortals
 Haumea, consort of Tagaroa
 Tiki, The first man
 Mauike, fire goddess
 Poaru, the underworld
 Po-porutu and pouaru, the heaven of happiness 
 Po-garepurepu and po-kine, the heaven of darkness, of fear and dread

See also
Polynesian narrative
Ghosts in Polynesian culture

References

Mangareva